The Kudroli Shri Bhagavathi Kshetra temple is on a two-acre scenic plot in the heart of Mangalore in Karnataka. It is close to Hampankatta.

Hindu temples in Mangalore
Tourist attractions in Mangalore